Stephen Adly Guirgis is a Pulitzer Prize Winning American playwright, screenwriter, director, and actor. He is a member and a former co-artistic director of New York City's LAByrinth Theater Company. His plays have been produced both Off-Broadway and on Broadway as well as in the UK. His play Between Riverside and Crazy won the 2015 Pulitzer Prize for Drama.

Early life
Guirgis is the son of an Egyptian father and an Irish American mother. He was raised on New York City's Upper West Side. He attended school in nearby Harlem and graduated from University at Albany, SUNY in 1992. He studied theatre at HB Studio.

Career

Writing
Guirgis' play Between Riverside and Crazy premiered Off-Broadway at the Atlantic Theater Company in July 2014 and closed on August 23, 2014. It then was produced by Second Stage Theatre, opening in previews on January 16, 2015, officially on February 11, 2015. Directed by Austin Pendleton, the play featured Stephen McKinley Henderson. The play received a nomination for the 2015 Drama League Award, Outstanding Production of a Broadway or Off-Broadway Play. The play won the 2015 Outer Critics Circle Award, Outstanding New Off-Broadway Play. The play won the 2015 New York Drama Critics Circle Award for Best Play. The play won the 2015 Lucille Lortel Award, Outstanding Play.
Artists Repertory Theatre, located in Portland, Oregon, staged Between Riverside and Crazy from March 4 to April 1, 2018. The show is slated to have its Broadway debut on November 30th, 2022.

His play The Motherfucker With the Hat was nominated for seven TONY Awards and premiered on Broadway in 2011 and featured Bobby Cannavale, Chris Rock, Elizabeth Rodriguez, Annabella Sciorra and Yul Vazquez. It was also performed in San Francisco at San Francisco Playhouse in January 2013 where it received positive reviews.

His award-winning most recent play "Halfway Bitches Go Straight To Heaven", directed by John Ortiz in 2019 in a LAByrith Theater/Atlantic Theater co-production features a cast of eighteen plus a goat and garnered OBIE Awards for its two stars Liza Colon-Zayas and Elizabeth Rodriguez.  
 
The Little Flower of East Orange, starring Ellen Burstyn and directed by Philip Seymour Hoffman, was produced Off-Broadway by the Labyrinth Theatre Company at The Public Theater, opening on April 6, 2008 and closing on May 4, 2008. The play was 
developed at the Manhattan Theatre Club's "6 @ 7" series.

Judas Iscariot premiered Off-Broadway on March 2, 2005 at The Public Theatre and was directed by Philip Seymour Hoffman. The play completed a critically acclaimed run in London at the Almeida Theater on May 10, 2008.

His play Our Lady of 121st Street ran originally in an Off-Broadway production by the LAByrinth Theater at Center Stage/NY and then transferred to the Union Square Theatre from March 6, 2003 to July 27, 2003. The play was directed by Philip Seymour Hoffman. The play received: 10 best plays of 2003; Lucille Lortel, Drama Desk, and Outer Critics Circle Best Play nominations.

Jesus Hopped the 'A' Train, premiered Off-Broadway in a production by LAByrinth Theater Company in 2000. It was produced in London at the Donmar Warehouse in 2002, and was nominated for the Olivier Award, Best New Play for 2003, as well as the Edinburgh Festival Fringe First Award.

His play In Arabia We'd All Be Kings ran Off-Broadway in 1999. A production at the Elephant Theatre Company in Hollywood, California in 2007 received four LA Drama Critic's Circle Awards: Production, Writing, Scenic Design and Lighting Design.

His play The Last Days of Judas Iscariot was produced Off-Broadway by LAByrinth in collaboration with The Public Theater in 2005, and was named one of the year's "10 best" plays by Time magazine and Entertainment Weekly.

His one-act play, Dominica The Fat Ugly Ho, was directed by Adam Rapp as part of the 2006 E.S.T. Marathon.

In Film, Stephen has contributed to the work of Halle Berry.

Television writing credits include NYPD Blue, David Milch's short-lived CBS drama Big Apple, and Shane Salerno's short-lived NBC series UC: Undercover.  Guirgis collaborated with Academy Award nominated director Baz Luhrmann on The Get Down, a Netflix Series about the birth of hip-hop in the 1970s.

Directing
He developed and directed Liza Colón-Zayas' play Sistah Supreme for Danny Hoch's Hip Hop Theater Festival in 2000 Marco Greco's award-winning Behind the Counter with Mussolini at the York Theatre (1998 in New York) and Los Angeles (1999 and 2002), and directed Melanie Maras' Kiss Me on the Mouth for InViolet Rep in 2009.

Acting
As an actor, Guirgis is currently a series regular portraying Frank Mariani on HBO's "Winning Time". He appeared in Brett C. Leonard's stage play Guinea Pig Solo, produced by LAByrinth at the Public Theater in 2004.  He has had leading roles in films such as Todd Solondz's Palindromes (2004), Brett C. Leonard's Jailbait (2004), and Kenneth Lonergan's Margaret (2011). Other credits include the 1997 Law & Order episode "Terminal" and films such as Meet Joe Black (1998), Blackbird (2007), Trainwreck: My Life as an Idiot (2007), Noise (2007), Synecdoche, New York (2008), and Philip Seymour Hoffman's directorial debut Jack Goes Boating (2010).

Controversy 
In mid-2017 Guirgis was embroiled in a public copyright debate with a small theater in San Francisco who had produced a highly edited and altered version of The Last Days of Judas Iscariot. While he was initially sympathetic to the issues surrounding the production, when the theater refused to provide a suitable insert in the show notes explaining their edits were made without the playwright's permission, Guirgis became incensed and had the show shut down.

Personal life
Guirgis has used improvisational theater to "teach HIV/AIDS prevention, conflict resolution, and leadership" in prisons, schools, shelters, and hospitals. Guirgis was close professional and personal friends with late actor Philip Seymour Hoffman with whom he was a frequent collaborator.

Awards, nominations, and honors
Guirgis was awarded a 2006 PEN/Laura Pels Theater Award for a playwright in mid-career,
a 2006 Whiting Award, and a 2004 TCG fellowship. He attended the 2006 Sundance Screenwriter's Lab,
 and was named one of 2004's 25 New Faces of Independent Film by Filmmaker Magazine.

In 2014, Guirgis was awarded the Steinberg Distinguished Playwright Award.

Guirgis is the recipient of new play commissions from Manhattan Theatre Club, Center Theater Group, and South Coast Repertory. He is a member of New Dramatists, MCC's Playwright's Coalition, New River Dramatists, Primary Stages, and the Actors Studio Playwright/Directors Unit.

He received the 2013 Windham–Campbell Literature Prize.

He received the 2015 Pulitzer Prize for Drama for Between Riverside and Crazy

Our Lady of 121st Street received the Lucille Lortel Award nomination, Outstanding Play, Outstanding Director (Hoffman); 2003 Outer Critics Circle Award nomination, John Glassner Award; Drama Desk Award nomination, Director (Hoffman) and Outstanding Play

He received a Literature Award from the American Academy of Arts and Letters in May 2016.

Plays written by Guirgis
Race, Religion and Politics
Den of Thieves
Jesus Hopped the 'A' Train
The Little Flower of East Orange
Our Lady of 121st Street
In Arabia We'd All Be Kings 
The Last Days of Judas Iscariot
Dominica the Fat Ugly Ho
The Motherfucker with the Hat
Between Riverside and Crazy (Winner of the 2015 Pulitzer Prize for Drama)
Halfway Bitches Go Straight to Heaven

Filmography
Jailbait (2004)
Synecdoche, New York (2008)
Margaret (2011)
Vice (2018)
Funny Pages (2022)

Notes

External links

Profile and photo at LAByrinth Theater Company
Profile and Production History at The Whiting Foundation

1965 births
21st-century American dramatists and playwrights
21st-century American male actors
American male film actors
American male stage actors
American people of Irish descent
American writers of Egyptian descent
Living people
Place of birth missing (living people)
University at Albany, SUNY alumni
Writers from New York City